Indu  Bhushan Roy (born 5 November 1961) is an Indian former cricketer. He played 31 first-class matches for Bengal between 1987 and 1994.

See also
 List of Bengal cricketers

References

External links
 

1961 births
Living people
Indian cricketers
Bengal cricketers
Cricketers from Kolkata